Kuenga Loday is a Bhutanese politician who was a member of the National Assembly of Bhutan from October 2018 to November 2021.

Education
He holds a Master of Public Administration degree.

Political career
He was elected to the National Assembly of Bhutan as a candidate of DPT from Khamdang-Ramjar constituency in 2018 Bhutanese National Assembly election. He received 3602 votes and defeated Karma Gyeltshen, a candidate of DNT.

In August 2021 Loday was sentenced to five years in prison for illegal road construction. He resigned his seat in the National Assembly in November 2021. Karma Gyeltshen of the DNT won the by-election to replace him.

References

1977 births
Living people
Bhutanese MNAs 2018–2023
Druk Phuensum Tshogpa politicians
Bhutanese politicians
Druk Phuensum Tshogpa MNAs